Herbert L. Meschke (March 18, 1928 – May 19, 2017) was an American politician and judge.

Born on a ranch near Medora, North Dakota, Meschke went to the Belfield, North Dakota High School. He then received his bachelor's degree from Jamestown College, in 1950, and his law degree from the University of Michigan Law School, in 1953. He practiced law in Minot, North Dakota. Meschke served as a Justice on the North Dakota Supreme Court from 1985 to 1998. He served in the North Dakota House of Representatives from 1965 to 1966 and in the North Dakota Senate from 1967 to 1970 and also served as Senate Minority Leader. Meschke died on May 19, 2017 in his home near Minot.

References

External links
Herbert L. Meschke biography
North Dakota Supreme Court official website

1928 births
2017 deaths
People from Billings County, North Dakota
People from Minot, North Dakota
University of Jamestown alumni
University of Michigan Law School alumni
Members of the North Dakota House of Representatives
North Dakota state senators
Justices of the North Dakota Supreme Court
20th-century American judges